Nový Malín (until 1947 Frankštát) is a municipality and village in Šumperk District in the Olomouc Region of the Czech Republic. It has about 3,600 inhabitants.

Administrative parts
Villages of Mladoňov and Plechy are administrative parts of Nový Malín.

Etymology
The original German name of the village was derived from the personal name "Frank", who was probably its founder. The Czech name was created by transcription of the German name.

After World War II, the municipality was renamed to Nový Malín ("New Malín") in honor of Malyn/Český Malín. It was a Czech village in Volhynia (today's Mlyniv Raion in Ukraine) destroyed by Nazis (with the help of Poles (or Polish speakers)) on 13 July 1943, with 374 Czechs being killed.

Geography
It lies in the Hanušovice Highlands. The built-up area is situated in the valley of the Malínský Stream.

History
The first written mention of Frankštát is from 1350. In 1398, it was referred to as a market town, but since 1583, it has been again only a village. In 1569, Frankštát was sold and joined to the Šumperk estate.

In the mid-19th century, the village became industrialised. Several small factories were established, most notably a brickyard and a chamotte goods factory. At the beginning of the 20th century, 95% of the population were Germans.

After World War II, the German population was expelled. The municipality was renamed in 1947. Nový Malín was resettled by Czech families, including 120 Volhynian Czechs from the area of Český Malín.

Demographics

Notable people
Anton Emil Titl (1809–1882), Austrian composer and conductor; studied here in 1821–1824

References

External links

Villages in Šumperk District